CFBDS J005910.90−011401.3 (also CFBDS J0059−0114 or CFBDS0059) is a brown dwarf with a low temperature of only 625 K, located in constellation Cetus about 30 light-years away.

References

Cetus (constellation)
Brown dwarfs
CFBDS objects